Inheaven were an English four-piece alternative band from South London. Formed in 2014, the band released their first single "Regeneration" in 2015 via Julian Casablancas' label Cult Records. The single was supported by BBC Radio 1/BBC6 Music DJs Annie Mac, Phil Taggart, Steve Lamacq and Chris Hawkins. The band were featured in DIY and XFM's ones to watch for 2016 with NME heralding them "one of the UK’s most exciting new bands". The band also topped DIYs readers poll in 2016 coming in first place for Track of the Year, second for band of the year and fourth best live act of the year.

They spent the majority of 2016 and 2017 supporting acts such as Sundara Karma, Circa Waves, Jamie T, Blossoms, Yak and The Magic Gang and played a number of international festivals including Reading and Leeds, Glastonbury and Bilbao BBK live finishing the year with a sold out headline show at London Scala.

On 1 September 2017, they released their debut album to critical acclaim, with NME calling it “Indie’s most dangerously exciting debut-album”. In 2018 the band released the stand alone single "Sweet Dreams Baby" in support of their 20 date tour of the United States with Pale Waves.

On Christmas Eve 2018, Inheaven announced they were splitting up. Members Chloe Little and James Taylor subsequently released singles under the name Wings of Desire.

Discography

Albums

Singles

Music videos

References

English indie rock groups
Musical groups from London
Cult Records artists